Camille Karie and Kennerly Caye Kitt (born 1989) are American identical twin actresses and electric/acoustic harpists, who compose, arrange, and perform as The Harp Twins.  The Kitt sisters have released over 100 singles online, as well as nine physical albums of both covers and original songs. As actresses, the Harp Twins have appeared in several films.

Biography
Camille and Kennerly Kitt are of Norwegian, Swedish and Finnish descent. The twins began playing piano as children, followed by the harp in junior high school. They earned money for their first harp by taking on jobs such as babysitting and dog-walking in order to show their mom they were serious about playing the harp. Their first harp was a used lever harp.

Both Camille and Kennerly hold Bachelor of Music degrees in Harp Performance and graduated with highest honors from Wheaton College Conservatory of Music. Although they are classically trained, their true musical passion is arranging and performing contemporary music for harp duet. They are also third-degree black belts in Taekwondo, and are former Taekwondo instructors. While sparring, Kennerly broke two of her fingers, while Camille required stitches in her face as the result of a puncture wound sustained while holding a board that Kennerly was breaking. These incidents made them decide to stop practicing martial arts, focusing on the harp instead.

Musical career

Camille and Kennerly perform as the rock and Celtic harp duo the Harp Twins; they are best known for their duet arrangements of contemporary songs from artists including Iron Maiden, Kansas, The Rolling Stones, Metallica, Lady Gaga, Pink Floyd, Aerosmith, Rihanna, Guns N' Roses, Coldplay, Enya and Journey, as well as musical scores for video games, films, and television.

Bailey Johnson, writing at the CBS News "Feed Blog", described their arrangement of The Cranberries' "Zombie" as "elegant, wistful and an excellent tribute". Huffington Post arts reporter Mallika Rao said of their Game of Thrones theme arrangement: "Yes, there have been other attempts to cover Ramin Djawadi's haunting tune before, but this one is now the only one." Megan Bledsoe, in her Doctorate of Musical Arts in Harp Performance dissertation remarks that while groups like Harptallica and the Harp Twins provide a new perspective on previous instrumentation choices within these genres, "the resulting sound of these ensembles, which very closely resembles any harp duet throughout history ... ultimately perpetuates the angelic, calm, feminine stereotypes of the instrument." United Kingdom-based heavy metal music magazine Metal Hammer has an alternative assessment of the Harp Twins. In a "Hot New Band" feature on the Harp Twins entitled "Harp Attack", Metal Hammer remarks: "Rather than turn their attention to obvious, classically grounded territory, The Harp Twins have made a name for themselves covering the likes of Iron Maiden, offering classics like Fear of the Dark a fascinating new lease on life." Ahead of a concert tour in the summer of 2022, they started work with a set of death metal performers, the Volfgang Twins, moving increasingly into a binary light-dark alignment.

In October 2014, Camille and Kennerly represented the United States and performed at the 8th annual World Harp Festival, in Asunción, Paraguay, which brought together more than 30 national and international artists.

Camille and Kennerly perform on Venus "Classic" Concert Grand pedal harps and Lyon & Healy "Silhouette" Electric lever harps.

Acting
Camille and Kennerly portrayed "The Merry Christians" in the film Politics of Love, directed by William Dear, and "The Marcelli Twins" in the dark teen comedy blacktino, produced by Elizabeth Avellan.   Camille and Kennerly can be seen in the trailer for blacktino. Additionally, the Harp Twins had minor roles in Delivery Man, starring Vince Vaughn and appeared in the season six finale of The Walking Dead.

Discography

Albums
 Harp Attack (December 2013). Harp covers of rock and metal songs.

 Harp Fantasy (December 2013). Harp covers of video game, anime, film and television soundtracks.

 Harp Attack 2 (February 2015). Harp covers of rock and metal songs.

 Harp Fantasy 2 (May 2016). Harp covers of video game, anime, film and television soundtracks.

 Harp Attack 3
 Harp Fantasy 3
 Winter Lights
 Harp Reflections
 Harp Attack 4

Single releases

The Harp Twins have released many of their harp duet performances in online stores and as online videos.

Here is a partial list.

Filmography
Camille and Kennerly have appeared in several full-length and short films.

Delivery Man (2013)
Politics of Love (2011) 
blacktino (2011)
T is for Twine (2011)
Super Force 5 (2010)
Elephant Medicine (2010)
Inside America (2009)
The End of Lost Beginnings (2009)
Lost Along the Way (2008)

References

External links
Camille and Kennerly's Official Harp Website
Camille and Kennerly's Official YouTube Channel

Identical twin actresses
Twin musical duos
American film actresses
American rock harpists
American twins
Living people
Musical groups established in 2009
Wheaton College (Illinois) alumni
American female taekwondo practitioners
1989 births
Identical twin females
Female musical duos
American YouTubers
Music YouTubers
American people of Finnish descent
21st-century American women musicians